Loyola Academy is a private, Catholic, co-educational college preparatory high school run by the USA Midwest Province of the Society of Jesus in Wilmette, Illinois, a northern suburb of Chicago, and in the Roman Catholic Archdiocese of Chicago. It is a member of the Jesuit Secondary Education Association and the largest Jesuit high school in America, with over 2,000 students from more than 80 different zip codes throughout the Chicago area. It was founded by the Jesuits in 1909.

History
Loyola Academy was founded as a Roman Catholic, Jesuit, college preparatory school for young men in 1909. The school was originally located in the Rogers Park neighborhood of Chicago, on the campus of Loyola University Chicago's Dumbach Hall; it moved to the current Wilmette campus in 1957. Both Loyola University and its prep school adjunct, Loyola Academy, grew out of St. Ignatius College Prep, a Roman Catholic, Jesuit college preparatory school in Chicago that was founded in 1870 as St. Ignatius College, with both university and preparatory programs for young men. While St. Ignatius transitioned to being solely a preparatory school and remained in the same location, Loyola Academy and University were established in Rogers Park. All three institutions were named after the Basque intellectual and a military officer in the army of a Duke, St. Ignatius of Loyola, who founded the Jesuits.

As a precondition to granting approval to move to the suburbs, the Archdiocese of Chicago required the Jesuits to stipulate that they would continue to serve the young Roman Catholic men of the city of Chicago. Consequently, Loyola Academy has had a significant representation of Chicago residents of various financial means, giving the school an economic diversity fairly unique in the Chicago area. This was achieved through the use of various scholarships and forms of financial aid.

Loyola Academy maintained the strict disciplinary and academic regimen seen in most of the exclusive American prep schools during the bulk of its history. Students were required to wear blazers and ties, maintain silence when moving between classes, attend weekly Mass on campus, address their teachers as either "sir" or "Father", and also maintain a demeanor befitting the Jesuit educational ideal of "Men for others."

One of Loyola's "sister schools" was Regina Dominican High School, an all-girls Academy located less than a mile away in Wilmette. Beginning in 1970, small groups of select Regina students began commuting to Loyola to take selected advanced science and computer science classes, as these classes were unavailable on their campus at the time.

The Jesuit presence has fallen off from what it once was, with some 40 priests teaching and working at the school in 1961, down to 11 out of roughly 200 staff members in 2007. The priests left for a variety of reasons. Some left due to the child abuse cases surrounding the Catholic church.

Loyola Academy affiliated with Saint Louise de Marillac High School, an all-girls high school from Northfield, Illinois and became co-educational in 1994. The affiliation was done for financial reasons.  The President of Marillac was approached by Loyola to consider a co-ed option on the North Shore as requested by the Archdiocese. About that same time, Loyola added on to their existing building. In 2003, Loyola Academy opened a new  campus in Glenview, Illinois. The property, near the decommissioned Glenview Naval Air Station (NAS Glenview), was purchased by Loyola in 2001 and now houses several athletic fields for lacrosse, baseball, softball, and soccer, a cross country path, and a wetland preserve area that has been used as a natural laboratory for science classes.

While Loyola Academy is a Jesuit, Catholic school, it has always admitted non-Catholics seeking a Loyola education.

Academics

Loyola Academy offers a comprehensive liberal arts curriculum with over 110 courses in language arts, fine arts (dance, music, theater, visual arts, and architecture), foreign languages (Spanish, French, Latin, Mandarin Chinese, and Ancient Greek), mathematics, physical education, science, social studies, and theology. (As it is a college-preparatory high school, it does not offer any true vocational courses.) The school has two competitive honors programs (the Dumbach Scholars and the Clavius Scholars) and a plethora of students enrolled in AP classes. Loyola also offers the O'Shaughnessy Program, which assists students who show the potential for success in college but may require smaller classes and extra help from teachers. Annually, about 99% of students are accepted by four-year universities.

The school fields a Certamen team and in 2005 six students received perfect scores on the National Latin Examination.  Loyola is also very active in forensics, Scholastic Bowl, and Science Olympiad competitions. In 2013, Loyola's scholastic bowl team placed third at both NAQT HSNCT and PACE NSC, the best performance of a team from Illinois at both national championship tournaments.

Service
Loyola places a strong emphasis on community service, encouraging students to be "Women and Men for Others, Leaders in Service." During the summer, many students join service sites across the United States and around the world, and during the school year Loyola's Arrupe Service Program allows students to in participate in Amnesty International, Habitat for Humanity International, and various other community outreach programs. Programs include children and refugee opportunities such as Catholic Charities Tutoring, elder care opportunities such as Maryhaven Nursing and Rehabilitation Center, individuals with disabilities opportunities such as Our Place, and soup kitchens such as A Just Harvest. One of Loyola's stated objectives is that every graduate be "committed to doing justice", and thus it encourages students to contribute to their communities and learn more about the world around them. These service programs are complemented by a series of religious retreats. Students can participate in the Kairos retreat during their junior or senior year.

Athletics

Loyola Academy offers 16 women's sports and 17 men's sports. Its varsity teams are called the Ramblers, which copied from the nickname of the varsity teams at Loyola University. The school competes as a member of the CCL.

On 24 March 2018 the Loyola boys hockey team won the State Championship at the United Center, beating Stevenson High School 4–2. They were also State Runner Ups in 2019. The Loyola girls hockey team went to the State Championship at the United Center each year 2013–2017, beating Barrington High School 5–3 to win the State Championship in 2016.

In 2009, the women's softball program won their first IHSA state championship, beating Edwardsville 2–0 in the championship game.

In 2009, the men's cross country team was ranked #1 in the nation for a week by Dyestat, was state runner-up, third at the Nike Cross Nationals Midwest Regional, and received an at-large bid to join York and Neuqua Valley at the national meet in December. They continued to earn fourth place at the Nike Cross Nationals meet, the best of any team in the Midwest that year. 

The men's lacrosse team won 11 State Titles and 11 runner ups with three straight championships with from 2002 to 2004, with its most recent in 2018.

Prior to the IHSA Football Championships (1974), Loyola won the Prep Bowl in 1965, 1966, and 1969.  Loyola won the IHSA State Championship in football in 1993, 2015, 2018 and 2022 and was runners-up in 1992, 2011, 2013, 2016, and 2017. Football coach John Holecek has led Ramblers to the state playoffs every year since 2006, including three of the last five Illinois State 8A Finals. In November 2011, the Loyola Academy football team lost to Bolingbrook in the class 8A Illinois State championship. In August 2012, the Loyola Academy football team, along with Loyola students, faculty, families and alumni, traveled to Dublin, Ireland to participate in a football tournament. The Ramblers played a Jesuit high school powerhouse from Texas.  In a thrilling game with a last-minute field goal, the Ramblers fell to the Rangers 30–29. In the Semifinals of the IHSA playoffs, a valiant comeback by the Ramblers fell short.  They were upset 27–24 by Glenbard North, finishing the season with a record of 11–2. In 2013, Loyola lost to Naperville Central, 13–10, in the 8A State Football Championship. Loyola beat Marist 41–0 to claim the 2015 IHSA 8A Football Championship on November 28, 2015. On November 24, 2018 Loyola won the 2018 IHSA 8A Football Championship by beating Brother Rice High School 13–3. In 2022, Loyola won the IHSA Class 8A State Football Championship by beating undefeated Lincoln-Way East High School 13–3. This was the school fourth state championship win.

In 2014 Loyola won the Illinois State Girls Swimming Championship and defeated Fenwick 11-10 (OT) to capture the IHSA Boys Water Polo State Championship. The Ramblers were also State Water Polo Champions in 1978.

Loyola has had a storied history in rowing. In 2017, the Boys' Junior 8+ won the SRAA National Championships.

Notable alumni

Athletics
 Jamie Baisley a former linebacker for the Chicago Enforcers (XFL) and the Rhein Fire (NFLE). He played at Loyola Academy from 1989 to 1992 and then played four years at Indiana University (1993–1996).
Dan Bellino is a Major League Baseball umpire 
 George Bon Salle was a first round draft pick in the 1957 NBA draft.  He played briefly with the Chicago Packers.
 John Dee was the head men's basketball coach at the University of Alabama (1953–56) and the University of Notre Dame (1964–71).
 Robert J. Dunne was an Olympic decathlete
 Conor Dwyer is a swimmer who was a gold medalist in the 4*200 freestyle relay at the 2012 Summer Olympics as well as the gold medalist in the 4*200m freestyle and bronze medalist in the 200m freestyle in the 2016 Summer Olympics. 
 Colin Falls is a former Notre Dame basketball player who played professionally for Italy's Orlandina Basket.
 Rob Feaster is a former professional basketball player.
 Dave Finzer was an NFL punter (1984–85).
 John Fitzgerald was an Olympic pentathlete, competing in the 1972 and 1976 Olympics.
 Paul Florence was a Major League Baseball catcher (1926), playing for the New York Giants.
 Tim Foley was an All-American defensive back at Purdue, later an All-Pro NFL defensive back (1970–80), playing his career with the Miami Dolphins.  He was a member of the Super Bowl VII and Super Bowl VIII champions.
 Christian Friedrich is a professional baseball player.
 Charlie Leibrandt was a Major League Baseball pitcher (1979–93).  Pitching most of his career for the Kansas City Royals, he was a member of the 1985 World Series Champions.
 Freddie Lindstrom was a Major League Baseball third baseman and outfielder (1924–36), playing most of his career with the New York Giants.  He was elected to the Baseball Hall of Fame in 1976. 2
 Tom Machowski (born 1953), retired professional ice hockey defenceman
 Lucas McGee is a rowing coach for the United States National Team.
 Bert Metzger was an offensive guard, starring on the Notre Dame National Championship teams of 1929 and 1930.  He was elected a member of the College Football Hall of Fame in 1982.
 Al Montoya was an NHL goaltender (2008–2019). 3
 Jim Mooney was an NFL player (1930–35).
 Steve Quinn was a center (1968) who played for the Houston Oilers.
 Nick Rassas was an NFL safety (1966–68), playing for the Atlanta Falcons.
 Todd Rassas was a professional lacrosse player.
John Shannon is an American football long snapper, played for the Notre Dame Fighting Irish
 Bob Skoglund was an NFL end (1947) who played for the Green Bay Packers.

Politics and public service
 Michael Cabonargi, commissioner of Cook County Board of Review (2011–present)
 Mark Curran, Lake County Sheriff (2006–2018)
 Peter H. Daly was a Vice Admiral in the U.S. Navy and is the current CEO of the U.S. Naval Institute (2011–present).
 Richard A. Devine was the Cook County State's Attorney (1996–2008).
 Robert J. Egan, was an Illinois state senator and judge
 Neil Hartigan was an Illinois politician, serving as Lt. Governor of Illinois (1973–77) and Attorney General of Illinois (1982–90).
Neal Katyal was the lead counsel in the Supreme Court case Hamdan v. Rumsfeld.  He is currently Principal Deputy Solicitor General of the United States.
James C. Kenny was the United States Ambassador to Ireland.
 Dan Kotowski is an Illinois State Senator, representing the 33rd Senatorial District (2007–present).
 George M. O'Brien was a United States representative for the Illinois's 17th congressional district (1973–86).

Arts and letters
 Aylin Bayramoglu was a contender on Oxygen's reality TV show The Glee Project.
 Pat Foley is a sportscaster, best known for his work in ice hockey with the Chicago Blackhawks.
 Eckhard Gerdes is a novelist (Cistern Tawdry, The Million-Year Centipede, or, Liquid Structures and My Landlady the Lobotomist) and editor (The Journal of Experimental Fiction).
 Gilbert V. Hartke is a social activist and founded the drama department at the Catholic University of America.
 Brendan Leonard is a television producer. 1
 Mike Leonard is an author and correspondent for The Today Show
 David Marconi is a screenwriter (Enemy of the State, Live Free or Die Hard).
 Bill Murray is an actor and comedian (Lost in Translation, Caddyshack, Ghostbusters).
 Brian Doyle-Murray is an actor, and the older brother of actors Bill Murray and Joel Murray.
 Joel Murray is an actor and the brother of Bill Murray and Brian Doyle-Murray.
 John Musker is an animated film director (The Little Mermaid, Aladdin)
 Richard L. Newhafer, novelist and teleplay writer
 Jonathan Nolan is a writer
 Timothy L. O'Brien is a journalist and author.
 Chris O'Donnell is an actor (Scent of a Woman, Batman Forever, NCIS: Los Angeles).
 Westbrook Pegler was a newspaper columnist and critic of the Democratic Party.4
 Bill Plante is a journalist with CBS News.
 Gregory Qaiyum (GQ) is an actor and writer (The Bomb-itty of Errors).
 Jeffery Ameen Qaiyum (JAQ) is a beatboxer and contributor to The Bomb-itty of Errors.
 Robert Ryan (1927) was an actor (The Wild Bunch, The Dirty Dozen).
 Eddie Shin is an actor.
Keong Sim, actor
Peter Steinfels is an author (A People Adrift: The Crisis of the Roman Catholic Church in America)

Business and technology
 Ed Boon is the co-creator of the video game Mortal Kombat.
 Christopher Helt, immigration lawyer and founder of The Helt Law Group.
 Jim Irsay is the owner of the NFL Indianapolis Colts.
 Michael R. Fine is an author and expert on computer beta testing.
 Jim Moran was an auto dealer and philanthropist.
 Brian McIntyre is an NBA executive and former media relations director for the Chicago Bulls.

Television
 Eric Bolling, conservative political commentator on Fox News and Fox Business.
 Mike Lowe, WGN promotes reporter Mike Lowe – Robert Feder, Chicago Tribune – 10 June 2016
 Alex Maragos, NBC 5 promotes Alex Maragos to morning co-anchor – Robert Feder, Chicago Tribune – 30 June 2016

Notable staff
 John Holecek is a former NFL linebacker (1995–2002), playing most of his career with the Buffalo Bills.  He is currently the school's head football coach.

Notes
1 Did not graduate from Loyola; transferred to North Shore Country Day School after second year. 
² Did not graduate from Loyola; left after second year to play in the minor leagues. 
³ Did not graduate from Loyola; transferred to Fossil Ridge High School in Texas after second year. 
4 Did not graduate from Loyola; dropped out after a few semesters to take a job as a reporter.

References

External links

Loyola Academy
Society of Jesus
Chicago Province of the Society of Jesus
Jesuit Secondary Education Association

1909 establishments in Illinois
Buildings and structures in Wilmette, Illinois
Educational institutions established in 1909
Jesuit high schools in the United States
Private high schools in Cook County, Illinois
Roman Catholic Archdiocese of Chicago
Catholic secondary schools in Illinois